
Steinibühlweiher is a pond at Sempach in the Canton of Lucerne, Switzerland. The artificial reservoir has a surface area of 3 ha.

Lakes of the canton of Lucerne
Lakes of Switzerland
Sempach